Scaraphites is a genus of beetles in the family Carabidae, containing the following species:

 Scaraphites hirtipes W. J. Macleay, 1864
 Scaraphites humeralis Laporte, 1867
 Scaraphites laticollis W. J. Macleay, 1866
 Scaraphites lenaeus Westwood, 1842
 Scaraphites lucidus Chaudoir, 1863
 Scaraphites rotundipennis (Dejean, 1825)
 Scaraphites silenus (Westwood, 1842)

References

Scaritinae